Lucy DeCoutere (born 5 September 1970) is a Canadian actress and Royal Canadian Air Force officer, best known for her role as the character Lucy in the television series Trailer Park Boys.

Life and career
DeCoutere grew up as the youngest child of four of British and Czech parents. She attended grad school at Concordia University in Montreal and has held various jobs, including a kindergarten teacher in South Korea, and attended teachers college at Griffith University in Australia.

DeCoutere has performed in The Vagina Monologues. She is a female voice on the computer game Empress of the Deep - The Darkest Secret.

DeCoutere is a Major in the Royal Canadian Air Force, presently based in Ontario. As of 2013, she was a Training Development Officer.

On April 2, 2016, DeCoutere announced via Twitter that she was resigning from Trailer Park Boys after actor and co-star Mike Smith was arrested on suspicion of misdemeanor domestic battery..
Also on April 2, 2016, it was revealed by the Trailer Park Boys' publicist, Sheila Roberts, that DeCoutere had informed the show's producers a few weeks before Smith's arrest that she would not be returning for the show's next season. Statements released from the Trailer Park Boys production team indicated that the incident was misreported and that the call to the police was made by persons who had not witnessed the event. The woman was described by Smith as a friend, and she issued a statement that "at no time did [she] feel in danger" and that the incident was "perceived as something other than what it was." The charges against Smith were dropped due to a lack of evidence.

Jian Ghomeshi
 In October 2014, DeCoutere joined seven anonymous women in publicly alleging sexual assault by former CBC Radio personality Jian Ghomeshi; she was the first to publicly identify herself. Ghomeshi was charged with sexual assault and choking, but was acquitted of all charges at the trial involving DeCoutere, with the judge expressing doubt of the witnesses' testimonies.

Filmography
Trailer Park Boys: Don't Legalize It (2014) ... as Lucy
The Gospel According to the Blues (2009) ... as Social Worker
Trailer Park Boys: Countdown to Liquor Day (2009) ... as Lucy
Trailer Park Boys: The Movie (2006) ... as Lucy
Anniversary Present (2006) ... as Bridesmaid 2
Trailer Park Boys Christmas Special (2004) ... as Lucy
Shattered City: The Halifax Explosion (2003) ... as Woman #1 at Rally
The Event (2003) ... as Jody, Upstairs Neighbour
Trailer Park Boys (2001–2008, 2014–2016) ... as Lucy
Beefcake (1998) ... as Champ's Wife
The Hanging Garden (1997) ... as Bridesmaid

References

External links

1970 births
Canadian film actresses
Canadian people of British descent
Canadian people of Czech descent
Canadian stage actresses
Canadian television actresses
Canadian Screen Award winners
Living people
Actresses from Edmonton
Griffith University alumni
20th-century Canadian actresses
21st-century Canadian actresses
Royal Canadian Air Force officers
Canadian female military personnel
Concordia University alumni